Phrontis nassiformis is a species of sea snail, a marine gastropod mollusk in the family Cancellariidae, the nutmeg snails.

Description

Distribution
This  species occurs in the Pacific Ocean off Mexico and the Galapagos Islands.

References

 Petit R.E. (1987) A final note on Cancellaria nassiformis Lesson, 1842, and Nassarius corpulentus (C.B. Adams, 1852). The Veliger 29(3): 340–348
 Cernohorsky W. O. (1984). Systematics of the family Nassariidae (Mollusca: Gastropoda). Bulletin of the Auckland Institute and Museum 14: 1–356

External links
 Lesson A. (1842). Catalogue des mollusques rares ou nouveaux recueillis dans la Mer du Sud. Actes de la Société Linnéenne de Bordeaux. 12(39): 198-209
  Reeve, L. A. (1853-1854). Monograph of the genus Nassa. In: Conchologia Iconica, or, illustrations of the shells of molluscous animals, vol. 9, pls 1-29 and unpaginated text. L. Reeve & Co., London.
 Galindo, L. A.; Puillandre, N.; Utge, J.; Lozouet, P.; Bouchet, P. (2016). The phylogeny and systematics of the Nassariidae revisited (Gastropoda, Buccinoidea). Molecular Phylogenetics and Evolution. 99: 337-353.

Nassariidae
Gastropods described in 1842
Taxa named by René Lesson